Getúlio Pedro da Cruz (14 February 1947 – 4 April 2008), known as just Getúlio, was a Brazilian footballer. He competed in the men's tournament at the 1968 Summer Olympics.

References

External links
 

1947 births
2008 deaths
Brazilian footballers
Brazil international footballers
Olympic footballers of Brazil
Footballers at the 1968 Summer Olympics
Footballers from São Paulo
Association footballers not categorized by position